is a Japanese autobiographical novel by Toshiko Takagi, who lost her sister and mother in the Great Tokyo Air Raid and saw her father killed by P-51 Mustang before her eyes at Ninomiya Station when she was 13 years old. As of 2018, the original novel has sold more than 2.4 million copies in Japan. It was translated into German, Spanish, Hungarian and other languages. It was adapted into a live action film in 1979, a Japanese television drama series in 1980 and an anime film in 2005.

Adaptations

Live action film
The live action film, titled Tokyo Air Raid Glass Rabbit (東京大空襲　ガラスのうさぎ), is directed by Yūten Tachibana and was released on July 14, 1979.

TV series
The television drama series has 15 episodes and was broadcast on NHK from August 18 to September 5, 1980.

Anime film

The anime film is directed by Setsuko Shibuichi, animated at Magic Bus, and was released on May 14, 2005.

References

External links

1977 novels
1979 films
1980 Japanese television series debuts
1980 Japanese television series endings
2005 anime films
2005 films
Films based on Japanese novels
2000s Japanese-language films
Japanese autobiographical novels
Japanese animated films
Japanese novels adapted into films
Magic Bus (studio)
Japanese drama television series
NHK original programming